Ctenucha rubroscapus, the red-shouldered ctenucha moth, is a moth of the family Erebidae. It was described by Édouard Ménétries in 1857. It is found in western North America, where it is limited to low elevations west of the Cascade Mountains, south of Chehalis in Washington. The habitat consists of coastal grasslands adjacent to the ocean, as well as wet boggy meadows and wet prairie.

The length of the forewings is 19–20 mm. Adults are brilliantly coloured black, blue and orange. Adults are on wing from late June to September in one generation per year. It is a day-flying species.

The larvae feed on Poaceae and Cyperaceae species, including species of the genera Dactylis and Elymus. The larvae are black and densely covered with short tufts of white hairs.

References

rubroscapus
Moths described in 1857